Cantona may refer to:

People
Eric Cantona (born 1966). French actor, director, producer, and former football player
 Joël Cantona (born 1967), French football player, brother of Eric Cantona

Places
 Cantona (archaeological site), a Mesoamerican archaeological site in Mexico

See also
Semaeopus cantona, a moth species
Kerry Katona
 Cantone (disambiguation)